The Hongxi Emperor (16 August 1378 – 29 May 1425), personal name Zhu Gaochi (朱高熾), was the fourth Emperor of the Ming dynasty, reigned from 1424 to 1425. He succeeded his father, the Yongle Emperor, in 1424. His era name "Hongxi" means "vastly bright".

Biography
Zhu Gaochi was born on 16 August 1378 and was educated by prominent Confucian tutors. He often acted as regent in Nanjing or Beijing during his father's northern military campaigns.

He was uninterested in military matters but had prowess in archery.

Already in May 1421, during the reign of the Yongle Emperor, an order was issued for the suspension of Zheng He's maritime expeditions, apparently on account of their cost (although the order apparently did not affect the 6th voyage of Zheng He, staged around that time). Zhu Gaochi, as soon as he was enthroned as the Hongxi Emperor in September 1424, cancelled Zheng He's maritime expeditions permanently, arguably burned down the fleet or left the ships to decompose, and abolished frontier trade of tea for horses as well as missions for gold and pearls to Yunnan and Vietnam. He restored disgraced Confucian officials, such as the Yongle Emperor's minister of revenue Xia Yuanji (imprisoned since 1421), and reorganized the administration to give high ranks to his close advisors. Hanlin academicians became grand secretaries, and they dismantled his father's unpopular militaristic policies to restore civil government. The Hongxi Emperor improved finances by canceling requisitions for lumber, gold, and silver. Taxes were remitted so that vagrant farmers could return home, especially in the overburdened Yangtze River Delta. The Hongxi Emperor appointed a commission to investigate taxes. He overruled his secretaries by ordering that grain should be sent immediately to relieve disaster areas.

The Hongxi Emperor ordered that the capital be moved back to Nanjing from Beijing (which had been made the capital by the Yongle Emperor in 1421). However he died, probably of a heart attack, a month later in May 1425. His son had been declared heir apparent and became the Xuande Emperor at age 26. Although the Hongxi Emperor had a short reign, he is credited with reforms that made lasting improvements, and his liberal policies were continued by his son.

Family

Consorts and Issue:
 Empress Chengxiaozhao, of the Zhang clan (1379 – 20 November 1442)
 Zhu Zhanji, the Xuande Emperor (16 March 1399 – 31 January 1435), first son
 Zhu Zhanyong, Prince Jing of Yue (9 February 1405 – 5 August 1439), third son
 Zhu Zhanshan, Prince Xian of Xiang (4 April 1406 – 18 February 1478), fifth son
 Princess Jiaxing (1409 – 9 March 1439), first daughter
 Married Jing Yuan (d. 1449) in 1428
 Noble Consort Gongsu, of the Guo clan (1392–1425)
 Princess De'an (b. 1409), fourth daughter
 Zhu Zhankai, Prince Huai of Teng (1409 – 26 August 1425), eighth son
 Zhu Zhanji, Prince Zhuang of Liang (7 July 1411 – 3 February 1441), ninth son
 Zhu Zhanyan, Prince Gong of Wei (9 January 1417 – 3 January 1439), tenth son
 Consort Gongjingxian, of the Li clan
 Zhu Zhanjun, Prince Jing of Zheng (27 March 1404 – 8 June 1466), second son
 Zhu Zhanyin, Prince Xian of Qi (1406 – 7 November 1421), fourth son
 Zhu Zhan'ao, Prince Jing of Huai (28 January 1409 – 30 November 1446), seventh son
 Princess Zhending (d. 1450), seventh daughter
 Married Wang Yi in 1429, and had issue (one son)
 Consort Zhenjingshun, of the Zhang clan (d. 1419)
 Zhu Zhangang, Prince Xian of Jing (4 November 1406 – 11 December 1453), sixth son
 Consort Gongyihui, of the Zhao clan
 Princess Qingdu (9 October 1409 – 12 June 1440), personal name Yuantong, second daughter
 Married Jiao Jing (d. 20 January 1467) in 1428
 Consort Zhenhuishu, of the Wang clan (d. 1425)
 Unnamed daughter
 Consort Hui'anli, of the Wang clan (d. 1425)
 Consort Gongxishun, of the Tan clan (d. 1425)
 Consort Gongjingchong, of the Huang clan (1396–1425), personal name Jindi
 Consort Daoxili, of the Li clan
 Consort Zhenjingjing, of the Zhang clan (d. 1440)
 Unknown
 Princess Qinghe (1409–1433), third daughter
 Married Li Ming (d. 1435) in 1429
 Princess Yanping, fifth daughter
 Princess Deqing, sixth daughter

Ancestry

See also
 Chinese emperors family tree (late)

References

 

1378 births
1425 deaths
Ming dynasty emperors
15th-century Chinese monarchs
Yongle Emperor
People from Chuzhou
People from Fengyang